Vladimir Kazakbaev (born 19 November 1991) is an association football defender who plays for FC Abdysh-Ata Kant, as well as the Kyrgyzstan national team.

Career
Kazakbaev has played for FC Abdysh-Ata Kant since the beginning of his career in 2012. He made his national debut on 6 September 2016 in a 1–2 loss against The Philippines at Dolen Omurzakov Stadium. He played in his second national game on 6 October 2016 against Lebanon, in a 0–0 draw. He got his first win for the national team in a 1–0 win over Turkmenistan on 11 October 2016.

References

Living people
1991 births
Kyrgyzstani footballers
Kyrgyzstan international footballers
Association football defenders
FC Abdysh-Ata Kant players